Haakon Stein (born 16 January 1940) is a German former fencer. He represented the United Team of Germany at the 1964 Summer Olympics in the team épée event. Stein was also the West German épée champion in 1960, and won two international tournaments in Germany in the 1960s.

References

External links
 

1940 births
Living people
German male fencers
Olympic fencers of the United Team of Germany
Fencers at the 1964 Summer Olympics
Sportspeople from Koblenz